Akerson is a surname. Notable people with the surname include:

Daniel Akerson (born 1948), American businessman
George Edward Akerson (1889–1937), American journalist

See also
Arne Åkerson (born 1940), Swedish Olympic sailor